Scheibe-Alsbach is a former municipality in the Sonneberg district of Thuringia, Germany. Since 31 December 2012, it is part of the town Neuhaus am Rennweg.

References

Former municipalities in Thuringia